NGC 6790 is a young, compact planetary nebula with a high surface brightness located in the equatorial constellation of Aquila. Imaging by the Hubble Space Telescope shows elongated shells surrounding the central star. The expansion velocity of the neutral hydrogen component is in the range .

References

External links
 
 
 The Hubble European Space Agency Information Centre Hubble picture and information on NGC 6790

Planetary nebulae
6790
Aquila (constellation)